Festival Foods is a family owned grocery company operating stores throughout Wisconsin. It was founded as Skogen's IGA by Paul and Jane Skogen in 1946 in Onalaska, Wisconsin, and is still owned by the Skogen family. Festival's private label brands are supplied by SuperValu, with the majority under their Essential Everyday label.

History
In 1946, Paul and Jane Skogen opened Skogen's IGA with just $500. Paul's son, Dave Skogen, took over the company in 1976. In 1979, they acquired the Red Owl store in Holmen, Wisconsin. In 1991, Festival Foods opened their first store in Onalaska, Wisconsin, with the name licensed from Supervalu. In 2005, Dave Skogen was named 'Grocer of the Year' by the Wisconsin Grocers Association, in recognition of his work with Festival Foods. In 2006, Dave's son Mark Skogen became CEO. In 2014, Mark Skogen was also named 'Grocer of the Year' by the Wisconsin Grocers Association. In 2021 it was announced Festival Foods would open two more locations in the Milwaukee Area.

Road sign controversy 
In December 2016, Festival was sued by Metcalfe Inc., which operates three grocery stores in Wisconsin, over the use of Festival's "Road Sign Marks", which both Festival and Metcalfe used to promote local products. Metcalfe accused Festival of "intentional, deliberate and willful" violations of trademark laws, since Metcalfe applied for a trademark on its "Wisconsin Food Miles" road sign as compared to Festival's "Locally Grown" road sign. Festival said that it would fight the suit.

Weight violation and labeling error 
In September 2019, Festival Foods was fined $32,016 by state agency for labeling errors. The company had 39 weight violations and two labeling errors that the state Department of Agriculture, Trade and Consumer Protection found in seven Wisconsin stores, based on legal documents filed in Eau Claire County Court.

Subsidiaries
In 2010, Festival Foods purchased the Apple Creek Inn of De Pere, and renamed it The Marq. The Marq is a 550-seat banquet and catering facility. In 2013, Festival added a second Marq location in Suamico. On May 19, 2020, Festival announced the closure of the Marq due to the COVID-19 pandemic.

Corporate governance

Corporate headquarters
In September 2015, Festival announced plans for a new corporate headquarters facility in De Pere, Wisconsin. Festival Foods also maintains a support office in Onalaska, Wisconsin.

Charitable giving
In 18 cities in Wisconsin, Festival Foods sponsors an annual fireworks show.

Festival Foods also hosts the Turkey Trot, a 2 and 5 mile walk/run that takes place on Thanksgiving in ten communities in Wisconsin. Proceeds from the event go to the YMCA and the Boys and Girls Clubs of America.

Festival Foods also sponsors the Green Bay Marathon, Lifest, and Grocers on the Green Golf Outing.

In 2021 Festival Foods partnered with Hormel Foods to donate 7,000 lbs of ham to help feed homeless people in Milwaukee.

References

External links
Official Wisconsin website

Economy of the Midwestern United States
Supermarkets of the United States